Grumman F9F could be:

 F9F Panther - US Navy jet aircraft
 F-9 Cougar - fighter aircraft based on earlier F9F Panther